Ahmad Syahmi bin Shukri (born 27 April 1997) is a Malaysian professional footballer who plays as a centre-back for UiTM.

References

External links
 

1997 births
Living people
Malaysian footballers
Malaysia Premier League players
Malaysian people of Malay descent
Association football defenders
Kelantan United F.C. players
UiTM FC players